România Literară is a cultural and literary magazine from Romania. In its original edition, it was founded on 1 January 1855 by Vasile Alecsandri and published in Iași until 3 December 1855, when it was suppressed. The new series appeared on 10 October 1968 as a continuation of Gazeta Literară. It is the Writers' Union of Romania's official magazine.

The magazine is based in Bucharest and is published on a weekly basis.

Editors-in-chief
 Geo Dumitrescu (1968–1970)
 Nicolae Breban (1970–1971)
 George Ivașcu (1971–1988)
 D. R. Popescu (1988–1989)
 Nicolae Manolescu (1990–present).

References

External links
 Official website

1855 establishments in Europe
1855 establishments in the Ottoman Empire
19th-century establishments in Moldavia
Cultural magazines
Magazines established in 1855
Magazines published in Bucharest
Mass media in Iași
Romanian-language magazines
Literary magazines published in Romania
Weekly magazines published in Romania